The Madrasa-e-Jamiul Uloom Ambur is the Islamic Institute which imparts Hifz of Quran to the college and higher secondary students. It is located at Ambur, a town in Tirupattur district of Tamil Nadu, India. It was founded on 7 May 1998 (Thursday) after asar prayer by Aqdas Moulana Qari Habeeb Ahmed Sahib, Moulana Obaidullah Asadi Sahib, Moulana Gulam Mohammed Wastanvi Sahib, Maulana Mufti Salahuddin Sahib Qasmi and several prominent Islamic scholars (Ulema).

Mufti Salahuddin Sahib Qasmi is the principal of the Madrasa, and Natharsa Mohamed Sayeed Sahib is the correspondent of the Madrasa & Natharsa Nazimuddin sahib is the secretary of this madarsa. And Hafiz Niyaz Sahib, Hafiz Sayeed Sahib  are the teachers of the Madrasa.

Few Followings are the alumni Students who graduated from Hifz of the Qur'an.

Madrasas in Tamil Nadu
Universities and colleges in Vellore district
Educational institutions established in 1998
1998 establishments in Tamil Nadu